Warning - Danger is an extended play (EP) album by American recording gospel/soul singer Cissy Houston, released on Columbia Records. It consists of four songs, three co-written and all produced by Michael Zager taken from her album, Think It Over.

The EP is extended dance mixes of "Somebody Should Have Told Me", "An Umbrella Song" and Houston's Billboard Dance chart hit single "Think It Over", which peaked at #5 and Billboards Hot Soul chart at #32, also included is the self-titled track, "Warning - Danger".

Track listing

US, Vinyl LP Album

Production
Arranged By [Backing Vocals] – Cissy Houston, Michael Zager (tracks: A1 to B2)
Arranged By, Conductor – Michael Zager
Backing Vocals – Alvin Fields (tracks: A1 to B2), Cissy Houston (tracks: A1 to B2), Lani Groves (tracks: A1, B1), Whitney Houston (tracks: A1, B1, B2)

Credits
Produced, Arranged, Conducted – Michael Zager
Executive-producer – Jerry Love
Art Design – Paula Scher
Engineer – Bob Carbone, Rick Rowe
Mastered By  – Stuart Alan Love
Mixed By – Michael Barbiero
Photography By – Bill King
Recorded at Secret Sound Studios, New York City. 
Mixed at Mediasound, New York
Mastered at A&M Studios, Los Angeles.

Charts
Singles

References

External links
Cissy Houston Bio page
Cissy Houston - Warning - Danger LP
Cissy Houston - Warning - Danger LP

1979 albums
Cissy Houston albums
Columbia Records albums